Methylocystis rosea is a methanotrophic, Gram-negative, rod-shaped, non-spore-forming and non-motile bacterium species from the genus of Methylocystis which has been isolated from arctic wetland soil on the Svalbard Islands in Norway.

References

Further reading

External links
Type strain of Methylocystis rosea at BacDive -  the Bacterial Diversity Metadatabase

Methylocystaceae
Bacteria described in 2006